Claudia Giordani (born 27 October 1955) is an Italian former alpine skier who competed in the 1976 Winter Olympics and in the 1980 Winter Olympics.

She is the daughter of the Italian RAI journalist Aldo Giordani.

Biography
In 1976 she won the silver medal in the Olympic slalom event. In the giant slalom competition she finished 13th. Four years later she finished fifth in the slalom contest and tenth in the giant slalom event.

World Cup results
Wins

National titles
Giordani has won 14 national titles.

Italian Alpine Ski Championships
Downhill: 1974 (1)
Slalom: 1973, 1976, 1977, 1978, 1979 (5)
Giant slalom: 1973, 1974, 1976, 1978, 1979, 1980 (6)
Combined: 1973, 1976 (2)

See also
 Italy national alpine ski team at the Olympics

References

External links
 
 
 
 

1955 births
Living people
Alpine skiers from Milan
Italian female alpine skiers
Olympic alpine skiers of Italy
Alpine skiers at the 1976 Winter Olympics
Alpine skiers at the 1980 Winter Olympics
Olympic silver medalists for Italy
Olympic medalists in alpine skiing
Medalists at the 1976 Winter Olympics
Universiade medalists in alpine skiing
Universiade silver medalists for Italy
Competitors at the 1981 Winter Universiade